Ala-Suhka  is a village in Rõuge Parish, Võru County in southeastern Estonia. The population has been 2 in 2011.

In 2021, there is no population.

References

Villages in Võru County